Connor Glennon (born 2 February 1993) is a British tennis player.

Glennon has a career high ATP singles ranking of 1553 achieved on 26 November 2012. He also has a career high ATP doubles ranking of 906 achieved on 18 June 2012.

Glennon made his ATP main draw debut at the 2017 Memphis Open in the doubles draw, partnering Cedric De Zutter.

References

External links

1993 births
Living people
English male tennis players
British male tennis players
Sportspeople from Leicester
Tennis people from Leicestershire
20th-century British people
21st-century British people